Chadwell may refer to:

Locations
 Chadwell, Leicestershire
 Chadwell, Shropshire
 Chadwell Heath in the London Borough of Barking and Dagenham
 Chadwell Springs in Hertfordshire - one of the sources of the New River
 Chadwell St Mary in Thurrock

People with the surname
William Chadwell (born 1614), English lawyer and politician

See also
Shadwell (disambiguation)